Kabeer Kaushik is an Indian film director and screenwriter. Born and brought up in a Bihari family in Patna and graduated from Frank Anthony Public School in New Delhi.  He debuted with Sehar in 2005.

Filmography

References

External links
 

Living people
Year of birth missing (living people)
Hindi-language film directors
Indian male screenwriters
Writers from Patna
Film directors from Bihar
21st-century Indian film directors
Screenwriters from Bihar
People from Patna